Lam Woon-kwong  (born 19 April 1951) is a Hong Kong politician and civil servant. He has worked as Convenor of the Executive Council and Chairperson of the Equal Opportunities Commission.

Early years 
Lam Woon-kwong was born in 1951. He graduated from the Social Sciences Faculty of the University of Hong Kong with a Bachelor of Social Sciences in Economics and Sociology. He has two master's degrees: in Public Administration from Harvard University and in Buddhist Studies from the University of Hong Kong.

In government
Lam benefited from a meteoric rise midway through his civil service career (around the time of the Handover) due to the early retirement of many of Her Majesty's Overseas Civil Service officers and the local senior civil servants expected to fill their roles. Promoted thrice between 1993 and 1996, Lam became one of many junior officers who rose swiftly through the ranks. Speaking to the Standard in 1995, even he admitted his surprise.

Lam served as Director of Education for just nine months. He was appointed Secretary for the Civil Service by Governor Patten in 1996, the first to be promoted, rather than transferred, into the role. While there, he pushed through reforms despite significant opposition from unions.  He was Secretary for Home Affairs from July 2000 to June 2002.

Lam became Director of the Chief Executive's Office of the Hong Kong Special Administrative Region for Tung Chee Hwa in July 2002. In January 2005,  women's magazine Sudden Weekly (Issue 493) carried a story that included photographs of Lam with a woman outside a hotel in Tokyo and an interview with his wife of nearly 30 years. Lam resigned on the same evening, saying, "in view of the media report on my private affairs, I tendered my resignation to the chief executive today".

He became Chairperson of the Equal Opportunities Commission in February 2010. In July 2012, upon his appointment as Convenor of the Executive Council for the new Chief Executive, CY Leung, despite public concern at a possible conflict of interest, he retained his position as Chairperson of the Equal Opportunities Commission.  He was known for publicly disagreeing with Leung on occasion.

A HKU poll in 2016 rated him the most popular member of the Executive Council.

Other activities
For the 2008 Olympic Games, he was chief executive officer of Olympic Equestrian Events (Hong Kong). He is a governor of the Hong Kong Philharmonic Society.

Lam has been a regular commentator at the South China Morning Post since 2012.

Awards
2000: Gold Bauhinia Star
2005: Justice of the Peace
2009: Chief Executive's Commendation for Community Service Award

References

External links
 Exco bio

1951 births
Living people
Place of birth missing (living people)
Government officials of Hong Kong
Recipients of the Gold Bauhinia Star
Alumni of the University of Hong Kong
Harvard Kennedy School alumni
Members of the Executive Council of Hong Kong
Alumni of Queen's College, Hong Kong